Eupithecia breviculata is a moth of the family Geometridae. It is found in the Mediterranean region, Switzerland, Hungary, the Near East and North Africa. It is also found in Iran and Turkmenistan.

The wingspan is 15–20 mm. Adults are on wing from April to June and again from July to August in two generations per year.

The larvae feed on the flowers of Peucedanum and Pimpinella species. The species overwinters in the pupal stage.

Subspecies
Eupithecia breviculata breviculata
Eupithecia breviculata georgica Vojnits, 1977

References

External links
Lepiforum.de
schmetterlinge-deutschlands.de

Moths described in 1837
breviculata
Moths of Europe
Moths of Asia
Moths of Africa